Ruben A. Valdez (January 27, 1937 – October 1, 2019) was an American politician in the state of Colorado. He was a member of the Colorado House of Representatives from 1970 to 1978. During his term he served as Speaker of the House from 1975 to 1976, and as House Minority Leader from 1977 to 1978. He was the first Hispanic person to serve as Speaker of the Colorado House of Representatives. Born in Trinidad, Colorado, he was the youngest of nine children. He died at the age of 82 in 2019.

References

1937 births
2019 deaths
People from Trinidad, Colorado
Speakers of the Colorado House of Representatives
Democratic Party members of the Colorado House of Representatives